Alper Sezener (born 1977) is a Turkish author of novels and short stories.

Alper Sezener was born in Istanbul and graduated with a degree in philosophy (1999) and anthropology (2004) from Hacettepe University. After graduating he worked as an expert and administrator at the international development projects and construction-petroleum companies. He lives in Ankara.

Sezener's first book, titled Half Past Three, was published in Turkey in 2003. After a short time, he published his books The Hunter of Character (2004), Far From Love and Death (2007).

Although his books are called "existentialist novelettes" by some critics, his style has found acceptance by bohemian intellectuals of the new literature school.

He has won national prizes including the Ministry of Culture research Writing Awards (2002), Omer Seyfettin Story Awards (2003), Turkish Informatics Magazine, Science Fiction Story Awards (2004), Umit Kaftancioglu Story Awards (2005), Afyon Kocatepe Newspaper Story Awards (2007) in Turkey.

References 

1977 births
Turkish novelists
Living people